The Joshua Tree Tour was a concert tour by Irish rock band U2. Staged in support of their 1987 album The Joshua Tree, the tour visited arenas and stadiums across North America and Europe from April to December 1987. The tour was depicted on the video and live album Live from Paris, and on the 1988 album and documentary film Rattle and Hum.

Itinerary

This tour's opening night was 2 April at Arizona State University's Activity Center in Tempe, Arizona. The day before the opening night, Bono fell onto a spotlight he was carrying during a rendition of "Bullet the Blue Sky", cutting open his chin.  Bono had partially lost his voice as a result.  He asked the audience to help him sing the majority of the set, which they were happy to do.  At the time, it was explained by their publicists in a press release that it was due to the week of rehearsals the band held at A.S.U.'s Activity Center and he had over rehearsed his voice.  He had fully regained his voice for the second of the two shows at the arena on 4 April.

The first leg took place in American indoor arenas during April and May. The first leg finished with 5 concerts at the Brendan Byrne Arena in East Rutherford between 11 and 16 May.

The second leg in European arenas and outdoor stadiums ran from late May through to early August, starting at the Stadio Flaminio in Rome on 27 May. The final show of the European leg is at Páirc Uí Chaoimh in Cork on 8 August.

The third leg returned to American and Canadian arenas and stadiums in the autumn. The tour ended on 20 December back where it started in Tempe, Arizona, but this time at Sun Devil Stadium.

On 30 April, the band played the Pontiac Silverdome, their first headlining stadium show in the United States. While the show's reviews were positive, they said that a video screen is necessary for people at the back. U2 production manager, Willie Williams, recalls the debate within the band about the use of screens and whether they would divide the audience's attention between the stage and the screen. A video screen was installed behind the lighting tower at the 20 September show at the RFK Stadium in Washington, D.C. so the back half of the stadium could better see the band, and screens were used at most stadium shows for the rest of the tour.

The Joshua Tree Tour sold out stadiums around the world, the first time the band had consistently played venues of that size. The Joshua Tree and its singles had become huge hits and the band had reached a new height in their popularity.  Tickets for shows were often very hard to get, especially on the first American leg when they only played in arenas.

That first leg was also organised around multiple-night stands in centres of U2 fandom along the two U.S. coasts, with only a very few dates in the middle of the country. These multiple-night stands also featured an unusual set list twist. All but the last night would begin in conventional concert fashion with the rousing pair of "Where the Streets Have No Name" into "I Will Follow", but the last night in each city would begin with the house lights fully up and the band performing the early 1960s classic "Stand by Me", with guitarist the Edge singing one verse, all intended as a friendly, informal opening. The house lights would then stay up for "Pride (In the Name of Love)", only going off at the end of it; the rest of the set list would be consequently scrambled from the norm.

The new level of fame, exposure and the frantic nature of the tour put the U2 organisation under a large amount of stress.

Cover performances

At Wembley Stadium in London, Bono sang The Beatles' "Help!", dedicating it to those in the audience who were dreading another five years of the recently re-elected Prime Minister, Margaret Thatcher. As another sign of the group's confidence, they also covered The Beatles' heretofore untouchable "Helter Skelter", declaring "This is a song Charles Manson stole from the Beatles; we're stealin' it back." Other notable covers from the tour included Eddie Cochran's "C'mon Everybody", Peggy Seeger's "The Ballad of Springhill", Neil Young's "Southern Man", Curtis Mayfield's "People Get Ready" (during which Bono would invite a fan to play guitar on the song) and numerous Bob Dylan covers including "Maggie's Farm" and "I Shall Be Released".  On 20 April, following a performance of I Shall Be Released in Los Angeles, the band surprised the audience by bringing out Dylan himself for a performance of Knockin' on Heaven's Door.  During the performance, Bono jokingly said, "I usually make up my own words to Bob Dylan songs.  He says he doesn't mind."  Dylan replied in kind, saying "I do it too."  Bono often would sing excerpts of other songs, notably ones by The Rolling Stones and Lou Reed's Walk on the Wild Side, near the end of the song Bad as he had done during the Live Aid performance and would do on later tours.

U2 covered Ben E. King's "Stand By Me" at their 25 September, '87 show at Philadelphia's old JFK Stadium, accompanied by a guest performance from Bruce Springsteen.

The band performed "Christmas (Baby Please Come Home)" at their final concert in Tempe, Arizona on 20 December 1987.  The band had recorded the track for the compilation album A Very Special Christmas months earlier on the European leg of their tour.

Filming for Rattle and Hum documentary
The band filmed and recorded various shows from the tour for the documentary and album Rattle and Hum. The band filmed the black-and-white footage at Denver's McNichols Sports Arena on 7 and 8 November 1987. They chose the city following the success of their Live at Red Rocks: Under a Blood Red Sky video, which was filmed at Red Rocks Amphitheatre in 1983. "We thought lightning might strike twice", said guitarist The Edge. Seven songs from the second show were used in the film, none from the first. Hours before the second Denver show, an IRA bomb killed eleven people at a Remembrance Day ceremony in the Northern Irish town of Enniskillen (see Remembrance Day Bombing).  Bono addressed the event angrily during the band's performance of Sunday Bloody Sunday, which was included in the film.  Bono's reference to the number of people killed in the incident was later edited for the film to reflect the actual number.

The band also gave a brief, free performance in San Francisco, California three days later on 11 November 1987, billed as the "Save the Yuppies" concert, from which the performance of "All Along the Watchtower" was taken for the film and album.  During the performance of "Sunday Bloody Sunday", Bono observed a fan holding a sign with the letters "SF" and "U2" on it.  Believing the "SF" in the sign to refer to Sinn Féin, Bono reacted angrily to the fan and the sign, apparently not realizing that the "SF" more likely stood for San Francisco.  Also during the performance, Bono spray painted "Stop the Traffic, Rock and Roll" on the Vaillancourt Fountain in Justin Herman Plaza, which was captured in the film.  The act angered some, including then-mayor Dianne Feinstein.

At least part of the band's second concert in Fort Worth, Texas was filmed and featured in the film, as the band performed an early version of the then-unreleased song "When Love Comes to Town" with blues performer B.B. King.  The band would go on to tour with King on their Lovetown Tour two years later.

Colour outdoor concert footage was taken from the band's Tempe, Arizona shows on 19 December 1987 and 20 December 1987. The initial plan was that the colour outdoor footage would have been taken during 2 shows in Buenos Aires, but during the tour planning this became impossible due to heavy costs to transport all the equipment. The shows were the final two of the tour, having been held in the same city in which the tour opened.

Support acts
A number of opening acts were used for the tour. Lone Justice was still given emphasis in this role, as they had been on the Unforgettable Fire Tour, but it was not enough to give them a successful career.  Other openers included The Pretenders, Big Audio Dynamite, UB40, Little Steven, BoDeans, Mason Ruffner, World Party, Stevie Ray Vaughan, Spear of Destiny, The Waterboys, Hurrah!, Los Lobos, Buckwheat Zydeco, The Pogues, The Alarm, The Silencers, Primus, and Lou Reed.

On 1 November in Indianapolis, U2 appeared as their own support act, disguised as "The Dalton Brothers", playing between sets by the BoDeans and Los Lobos. They were dressed in Western outfits and wigs while Bono spoke with a twangy southern accent. Playing their own country-influenced song, "Lucille", and Hank Williams' "Lost Highway", only some of the audience in the front few rows recognised them. "The Dalton Brothers" also appeared at concerts in Los Angeles and Hampton, Virginia.

B.B. King was the opening act for both final shows of the tour on 19 and 20 December at Sun Devil Stadium in Tempe, Arizona, and in Fort Worth same year.

Injuries
During rehearsals on 1 April 1987, the day before the opening show in Tempe, Arizona, Bono fell onto a spotlight he was carrying during a rendition of "Bullet the Blue Sky", cutting open his chin. He was taken to a hospital and the wound was stitched up. Bono later said, "I was lost in the music and at the start of any tour you're just getting to know the physicality of the stage... and you're overestimating your own physicality. You think you're made of metal and you're not. Cuts and bruises, that's what I remember from The Joshua Tree."

Bono sustained a second injury on 20 September 1987 during a concert at RFK Stadium in Washington, D.C. on the third leg of the tour. He fell off the rain-slicked stage and dislocated his arm. He completed the performance and had his arm popped back into place after its conclusion. His arm was in a sling for twelve shows between 22 September and 20 October, which is visible at some points during the 1988 film Rattle and Hum.

Commercial performance
On the first North American leg of the tour, the band grossed US$7,501,329 from 465,452 tickets sold across 29 shows. For the Las Vegas show, 1,063 tickets remained unsold, equating to a 99.77% sellout for the 1st American leg. The 79 North American shows on the tour sold 2,035,539 tickets and grossed US$35 million. In total, the tour grossed US$40 million and drew 3 million attendees.

Set list
This set list is representative of the tour's average setlist as conducted by Setlist.fm, which represents all concerts for the duration of the tour.

 "Where the Streets Have No Name"
 "I Will Follow"
 "I Still Haven't Found What I'm Looking For"
 "Trip Through Your Wires"
 "MLK"
 "The Unforgettable Fire"
 "Exit"
 "Sunday Bloody Sunday"
 "In God's Country"
 "Gloria"
 "Help!" (The Beatles cover)
 "People Get Ready" (The Impressions cover)
 "Bad"
 "October"
 "New Year's Day"
 "Pride (In the Name of Love)"
Encore
 "Bullet the Blue Sky"
 "Running to Stand Still"
 "With or Without You"
 "40"

Tour dates

See also 
 List of highest-attended concerts
 List of highest-grossing concert tours

References
Footnotes

Bibliography

External links
 U2.com
 The Joshua Tree Tour on U2Gigs

U2 concert tours
1987 concert tours